The Word was a 1990s Channel 4 television programme in the United Kingdom.

Format
The show's presenters included Terry Christian, comedian Mark Lamarr, Dani Behr, Katie Puckrik, Jasmine Dotiwala, Alan Connor, Amanda de Cadenet and Huffty.  Originally broadcast in the old Tube time slot of 6 pm Friday evenings, The Word'''s main live show was shifted to a late-night timeslot from 9 November 1990. The magazine format allowed for interviews, live music, features and even game shows. The flexible late-night format meant that guests could do just about anything to be controversial.

There was also an 'I'll do anything to be on television' section called "The Hopefuls" which ran for half of series 4 and half of series 5 in which people did generally repulsive things in order to get featured on the programme.
Production
The show was the brainchild of Charlie Parsons and Christian and was originally produced for series 1 and 2 by the production company 24 Hour Productions, which later became Planet 24.

Paul Ross was the series editor on series 3 and 4, and became executive producer for series 5. Jo Whiley worked as a researcher/band booker on series 2 and half of series 3 and is credited as having given Nirvana their historic and notorious first TV appearance.

The programme ran for five series from 1990 to 1995. From the start, there was considerable tabloid backlash against the show. In mid 2000, Channel 4 screened a short-running compilation series titled Best of The Word, which mostly featured music performances.

Tango sponsored the show in 1994.

Notable moments
 Nirvana's international television debut performance of "Smells Like Teen Spirit", with Kurt Cobain declaring Courtney Love to be "the best fuck in the world."
 Singer/guitarist Donita Sparks of L7 removing her jeans and underwear during a performance, the full-frontal nudity displayed when she drops her guitar being briefly broadcast.
 The TV debut of Oasis playing "Supersonic".
 Rage Against the Machine playing "Killing in the Name", resulting in a stage invasion with guitarist Tom Morello and singer Zack de la Rocha both being stopped from performing by the chaotic crowd.
 Lynne Perrie, best known for her role as Ivy Tilsley in soap opera Coronation Street'', performing a tuneless rendition of the Gloria Gaynor song "I Will Survive".
 A very drunk Oliver Reed giving a barely coherent interview before performing "Wild Thing" by The Troggs with Ned's Atomic Dustbin."
 Shabba Ranks advocating crucifixion of homosexuals, which received universal condemnation including from presenter Lamarr.

References

External links

1990 British television series debuts
1995 British television series endings
British music television shows
Channel 4 original programming
Television series by ITV Studios
Television shows shot at Teddington Studios